Gregory "Greg" Hugh Montgomery Jr. (October 29, 1964 – August 23, 2020) was a National Football League punter from (1988-1997) for the Houston Oilers, Detroit Lions and Baltimore Ravens.

Raised in Shrewsbury, New Jersey, Montgomery played football at Red Bank Regional High School, where he had hoped to be a linebacker rather than a punter.

In his nine NFL seasons, Montgomery led the NFL in yards per punt average three times (1990, 1992, 1993), was selected to one Pro Bowl and First-team All-Pro (1993), and finished his career with 22,831 punting yards and 120 punts inside the opponents 20 yard line. His longest punt of 77 yards was with the Houston Oilers.

Montgomery is on the Michigan State University all-time team.

Post-playing career

In 2003, Montgomery started ZenPunt 5.0, and was the company's president/CEO.

References

External links
 Greg Montgomery
 Oilers' Montgomery dealing with bigger issues now
 in the NFL - The Gregory Montgomery Story

1964 births
2020 deaths
People from Morristown, New Jersey
American football punters
Michigan State Spartans football players
Houston Oilers players
Detroit Lions players
Baltimore Ravens players
American Conference Pro Bowl players
Players of American football from New Jersey
People from Shrewsbury, New Jersey
Red Bank Regional High School alumni
Sportspeople from Monmouth County, New Jersey